Euskal Bizikleta (Spanish: Bicicleta Vasca, English: Basque Bicycle) was an annual road cycling stage race held in the Basque Country in June. From 2005 to 2008, the race was organized as a 2.HC event on the UCI Europe Tour. In 2009, it was merged with the Tour of the Basque Country.

The first race was held in 1952, but it has only been called Euskal Bizikleta since 1991. The first winner (1952) was Louis Caput from France. The first winner of the 'modern' Euskal Bizikleta (1991) was Gianni Bugno. The most recent edition (2008) was won by Eros Capecchi from Italy.

Winners

References

External links

 Official website 
 

UCI Europe Tour races
Cycle races in the Basque Country
Recurring sporting events established in 1991
1991 establishments in Spain
Recurring sporting events established in 1952
1952 establishments in Spain